Kökényes (also Kuknis,  or Quinquenus; died after 1150) was a Hungarian prelate in the 12th century, who served as Archbishop of Esztergom around 1150.

Life
Based on his name, Kökényes was presumably born into the gens (clan) Kökényesradnót of Hispanic or French origin. It is possible his nephew was Mikod, Bishop of Győr. Historian Gyula Pauler identified his person with that provost Quuchinus, who appears in an undated royal charter, when King Géza II confirmed his father's donations to the Csatár Abbey.

Only one reliable source, the Kievan Chronicle mentioned his primacy. According to its narrative, when Géza II led his army against Volodimirko of Halych in the autumn of 1150, he captured Sanok, but Volodimirko bribed the group of Hungarian noblemen, including Archbishop "Kuknis", who persuaded Géza to leave Halych before November. The narration reflects Kökényes' secular influence in the Hungarian royal court.

According to a non-authentic charter, which is allegedly dated to 1145, Kökényes (now "Quinquenus") was already serving as Archbishop of Esztergom in that year. However the document (a royal donation letter), which proved to be a 15th-century forgery, contains several anachronistic elements and its witness list reflects the 1148–50 political and archontological snapshot. Kökényes possibly died either in 1150 or 1151 after a brief episcopal activity, as Martyrius succeeded him in 1151.

References

Sources

 
 
 

Archbishops of Esztergom
1150s deaths
12th-century Roman Catholic archbishops in Hungary
Kökényesradnót (genus)
12th-century Hungarian people